In geometry, the tetraoctagonal tiling is a uniform tiling of the hyperbolic plane.

Constructions 
There are for uniform constructions of this tiling, three of them as constructed by mirror removal from the [8,4] or (*842) orbifold symmetry. Removing the mirror between the order 2 and 4 points, [8,4,1+], gives [8,8], (*882). Removing the mirror between the order 2 and 8 points, [1+,8,4], gives [(4,4,4)], (*444). Removing both mirrors, [1+,8,4,1+], leaves a rectangular fundamental domain, [(∞,4,∞,4)], (*4242).

Symmetry 
The dual tiling has face configuration V4.8.4.8, and represents the fundamental domains of a quadrilateral kaleidoscope, orbifold (*4242), shown here. Adding a 2-fold gyration point at the center of each rhombi defines a (2*42) orbifold.

Related polyhedra and tiling

See also

Square tiling
Tilings of regular polygons
List of uniform planar tilings
List of regular polytopes

References
 John H. Conway, Heidi Burgiel, Chaim Goodman-Strass, The Symmetries of Things 2008,  (Chapter 19, The Hyperbolic Archimedean Tessellations)

External links 

 Hyperbolic and Spherical Tiling Gallery
 KaleidoTile 3: Educational software to create spherical, planar and hyperbolic tilings
 Hyperbolic Planar Tessellations, Don Hatch

Hyperbolic tilings
Isogonal tilings
Isotoxal tilings
Uniform tilings